Romance: En Vivo is a VHS video from Mexican singer Luis Miguel that was recorded in 1992 during the concert tour called Tour Romance (also known as Gira Romance )  that Luis Miguel perform in various places like Caracas, Venezuela, in the Circus Maximus Theatre in Las Vegas, Nevada, in a concert in Seville, Spain, and in the National Auditorium in Mexico City, where he broke the World Record by selling the 10,000 tickets for his only show in 3 hours.

The production of this video consists in taping all the concerts mentioned above. The result is that in the tape are featured parts of all concerts, making it in one tape with all the songs performed there.

Because the concerts were taped entirely, a years later were broadcast by various countries around South America and Mexico. From the show in the National Auditorium was recorded an EP that was released as América & En Vivo.

Song list 
Introduction
Oro De Ley
Amante Del Amor
Pupilas De Gato
Hoy El Aire Huele A Ti
Ahora Te Puedes Marchar
Alguien Como Tu
Entregate
Tengo Todo Excepto A Ti
Sera Que No Me Amas
No Me Platiques Mas
Contigo En La Distancia
La Puerta
La Mentira
Cuando Vuelva A Tu Lado
No Se Tu
Inolvidable
Un Hombre Busca Una Mujer
Cuando Calienta El Sol

Luis Miguel video albums
1992 video albums
1992 live albums
Live video albums
Warner Records video albums
Warner Records live albums